The African section of the 2014 FIFA World Cup qualification acted as the qualifies of the 2014 FIFA World Cup saw 52 teams from the Confederation of African Football (CAF) who competing for 5 spots of the 32 teams in the finals.

Format
Fifty-two out of the 53 national associations affiliated to CAF entered the qualifying to determine the continent's five slots for the next World Cup.

The proposed format, announced on 16 May 2011, began in November 2011 with the first round of 12 two-legged knock-out ties. The ties, involving the 24 lowest-ranked teams according to FIFA World Rankings, were drawn in Brazil on 30 July 2011.

The 12 winners joined the remaining 28 CAF entrants in the second round, which consists of 10 groups of 4. The winners of each group – held between June 2012 and September 2013 – advanced to the third round of 5 two-legged knock-out ties. The 5 winners of these ties – held in October and November 2013 – advanced to the 2014 FIFA World Cup finals.

Entrants
The July 2011 FIFA Ranking were used to seed the teams for the first two rounds, both of which were drawn in Brazil on 30 July 2011. (World rankings shown in brackets)

Notes
 did not participate in the 2014 FIFA World Cup qualifiers.

First round

The first round consisted of 12 home-and-away ties, featured the 24 lowest ranked teams in Africa. The ties were drawn at the World Cup Preliminary Draw at the Marina da Glória in Rio de Janeiro, Brazil, on 30 July 2011. The winners of these series proceeded to the second round.

Seeding
The July 2011 FIFA Ranking was used to seed the teams.

Matches
The first legs were scheduled for 11–12 November 2011, with the second legs on 15–16 November 2011.

|}

Note: Mauritius withdrew from the tournament on 31 October 2011. Liberia automatically advanced to the second round.

Second round

The second round saw the top 28 ranked CAF teams joined by the 12 winners from the first round. These teams were drawn into ten groups of four teams at the World Cup Preliminary Draw at the Marina da Glória in Rio de Janeiro, Brazil, on 30 July 2011. The matches were played from 1 June 2012 to 7 September 2013. The top team from each group advanced to the third round.

Seeding
The July 2011 FIFA Ranking was used to seed the teams.

† First round winners whose identity was not known at the time of the draw

Groups
Cameroon were suspended by FIFA on 4 July 2013 for government interference. The suspension was lifted on 22 July 2013.

Note: Scores marked by [a] are results awarded by FIFA.

Group A

Group B

Group C

Group D

Group E

Group F

Group G

Group H

Group I

Group J

Third round

The third round saw the 10 group winners from the second round drawn into five home and away ties. The winners of each tie advanced to the 2014 FIFA World Cup in Brazil.

Seeding
The draw of the play-offs was held on 16 September 2013 at the CAF headquarters in Cairo. The teams were seeded based on the September 2013 edition of the FIFA Ranking (shown below in brackets).

Matches
The matches were played in the periods of 11–15 October and 16–19 November 2013.

|}

Qualified teams
The following five teams from CAF qualified for the final tournament.

1 Bold indicates champions for that year. Italic indicates hosts for that year.

Goalscorers
There were 389 goals in 152 matches, for an average of 2.56 goals per match.

6 goals

 
 Mohamed Aboutrika
 Mohamed Salah
 Asamoah Gyan

5 goals

 Islam Slimani
 Salomon Kalou
 Juvenal
 Getaneh Kebede
 Saladin Said
 Bernard Parker
 Papiss Cissé

4 goals

 Trésor Mputu
 Yaya Touré

3 goals

 Sofiane Feghouli
 Hillal Soudani
 Razak Omotoyossi
 Aristide Bancé
 Jonathan Pitroipa
 Djaniny
 Didier Drogba
 Wilfried Bony
 Dioko Kaluyituka
 Emilio Nsue
 Pierre-Emerick Aubameyang
 Abdul Majeed Waris
 Sulley Muntari
 Mohamed Yattara
 Dennis Oliech
 Youssef El-Arabi
 Lazarus Kaimbi
 Emmanuel Emenike
 Oussama Darragi
 Jacob Mulenga

2 goals

 Saphir Taïder
 Guilherme
 Rudy Gestede
 Ofentse Nato
 Jerome Ramatlhakwane
 Prejuce Nakoulma
 Eric Choupo-Moting
 Samuel Eto'o
 Jean Makoun
 Héldon Ramos
 Platini
 Foxi Kéthévoama
 Nicaise Zimbori-Auzingoni
 Mahamat Labbo
 Lacina Traoré
 Chris Malonga
 Amr Zaki
 Randy
 Shimelis Bekele
 Mustapha Jarju
 Dominic Adiyiah
 Jordan Ayew
 Christian Atsu
 Sadio Diallo
 Ibrahima Traoré
 Ahmed Zuway
 Mahamadou N'Diaye
 Mamadou Samassa
 Houssine Kharja
 Domingues
 Rudolf Bester
 Sydney Urikhob
 Victor Moses
 Labama Bokota
 Meddie Kagere
 Sadio Mané
 Moussa Sow
 Alhassan Kamara
 Sheriff Suma
 Sidumo Shongwe
 Mbwana Samata
 Thomas Ulimwengu
 Amri Kiemba
 Lalawélé Atakora
 Issam Jemâa
 Emmanuel Okwi
 Tony Mawejje
 Christopher Katongo
 Collins Mbesuma
 Knowledge Musona

1 goal

 Nabil Ghilas
 Carl Medjani
 Madjid Bougherra
 Abdul
 Djalma
 Guedes
 Job
 Mabululu
 Bello Babatounde
 Mickaël Poté
 Stéphane Sessègnon
 Tebogo Sembowa
 Mogakolodi Ngele
 Charles Kaboré
 Djakaridja Koné
 Cedric Amissi
 Selemani Ndikumana
 Aurélien Chedjou
 Pierre Webó
 Benjamin Moukandjo
 Salif Kéïta
 Odaïr Fortes
 Marco Soares
 Babanco
 Mohamed Youssouf
 Gladys Bokese
 Patou Ebunga-Simbi
 Yves Diba Ilunga
 Dieumerci Mbokani
 Ladislas Douniama
 Ulrich Kapolongo
 Christopher Missilou
 Francis N'Ganga
 Fabrice N'Guessi
 Prince Oniangue
 Harris Tchilimbou
 Christopher Samba
 Kolo Touré
 Hosny Abd Rabo
 Mahmoud Fathalla
 Mohamed Zidan
 Hossam Ghaly
 Mohamed Nagy
 Viera Ellong
 Rincón
 Jônatas Obina
 Jimmy Bermúdez
 Abraham Tedros
 Tesfalem Tekle
 Minyahil Teshome
 Oumed Oukri
 Behailu Assefa
 Rémy Ebanega
 Bruno Ecuele Manga
 Momodou Ceesay
 Abdou Jammeh
 Jerry Akaminko
 John Boye
 Emmanuel Agyemang-Badu
 Kwadwo Asamoah
 Kevin-Prince Boateng
 Mubarak Wakaso
 Abdoul Camara
 Alhassane Bangoura
 Mohammed Diarra
 Seydouba Soumah
 Basile de Carvalho
 Tsoanelo Koetle
 Tsepo Lekhoana
 Bokang Mothoane
 Lehlomela Ramabele
 Tsepo Seturumane
 Thapelo Tale
 Litsepe Marabe
 Francis Doe
 Patrick Wleh
 Anthony Laffor
 Marcus Macauley
 Hamed Snousi
 Faisal Al Badri
 Andrew Murunga
 Brian Onyango
 Francis Kahata
 Titus Mulama
 Pascal Ochieng
 David Owino
 Victor Wanyama
 Yvan Rajoarimanana
 Falimery Ramanamahefa
 John Banda
 Robin Ngalande
 Robert Ng'ambi
 Gabadin Mhango
 Abdou Traoré
 Modibo Maïga
 Cheick Diabaté
 Hamza Abourazzouk
 Abderrazak Hamdallah
 Abdelaziz Barrada
 Younès Belhanda
 Clésio Baúque
 Maninho
 Miro
 Jerry Sitoe
 Whiskey
 Heinrich Isaacks
 Deon Kavendji
 Yacouba Ali
 Kamilou Daouda
 Mahamane Cissé
 Azubuike Egwuekwe
 Victor Obinna
 Ahmed Musa
 Godfrey Oboabona
 Nnamdi Oduamadi
 Ikechukwu Uche
 Jean-Claude Iranzi
 Olivier Karekezi
 Elias Uzamukunda
 Orlando Gando
 Ibrahima Baldé
 Dame N'Doye
 Samuel Barlay
 Kei Kamara
 Mohamed Kamara
 Ibrahim Kargbo
 Mustapha Bangura
 Ibrahim Bangura
 Kermit Erasmus
 Dean Furman
 Morgan Gould
 Katlego Mphela
 Siphiwe Tshabalala
 Katlego Mashego
 Thabo Matlaba
 Bakri Almadina
 Salah Ibrahim
 Mudathir El Tahir
 Muhannad El Tahir
 Saif Eldin Ali Idris Farah
 Nurdin Bakari
 Shomari Kapombe
 Mrisho Ngassa
 Erasto Nyoni
 Kalen Damessi
 Serge Gakpé
 Komlan Amewou
 Backer Aloenouvo
 Lalawélé Atakora
 Chadi Hammami
 Hamdi Harbaoui
 Saber Khelifa
 Fakhreddine Ben Youssef
 Wahbi Khazri
 Ahmed Akaïchi
 Godfrey Walusimbi
 Nathan Sinkala
 Masimba Mambare
 Lincoln Zvasiya

1 own goal

 Adam El-Abd (playing against Guinea)
 Wael Gomaa (playing against Ghana)
 Jonas Mendes (playing against Togo)
 Moses Chavula (playing against Kenya)
 Ludovic Sané (playing against Ivory Coast)
 Bernard Parker (playing against Ethiopia)
 Komlan Amewou (played against Libya)

References

External links
Results and schedule (FIFA.com version)
Results and schedule (CAFonline.com version)

 
CAF
FIFA World Cup qualification (CAF)